Vitan is a settlement northeast of Ormož in northeastern Slovenia. It lies on the regional road from Središče ob Dravi to Miklavž pri Ormožu. The area belongs to the traditional region of Styria. It is now included in the Drava Statistical Region.

References

External links
Vitan on Geopedia

Populated places in the Municipality of Ormož